The 2003 World Senior Curling Championships were held from April 2 to 6 at the Heather Curling Club and St. Vital Curling Club in Winnipeg, Canada.

The tournament was held partly in conjunction with 2003 World Men's Curling Championship and 2003 World Women's Curling Championship.

Men

Teams

Round robin

Group A

Group B

  Teams to playoffs
  Teams to tiebreaker

Tiebreaker
April 5, 14:00

Playoffs

Semi-finals
April 6, 9:30

Bronze medal game
April 6, 14:00

Final
April 6, 14:00

Final standings

Women

Teams

Round robin

  Teams to playoffs
  Teams to tiebreaker

Tiebreaker
April 5, 14:00

Playoffs

Semi-finalsApril 6, 10:30

Bronze medal gameApril 6, 16:00

FinalApril 6, 16:00

Final standings

References

External links

World Senior Curling Championships
2003 in Canadian curling
International curling competitions hosted by Canada
April 2003 sports events in Canada
2003 in Manitoba
Curling competitions in Winnipeg
2000s in Winnipeg